The Karanovo culture is a Neolithic culture (Karanovo I-III ca. 62nd to 55th centuries BC) named after the Bulgarian village of  (Караново, Sliven Province ). The culture, which is part of the Danube civilization, is considered the largest and most important of the Azmak River Valley agrarian settlements.

Discovery 

Archaeologists discovered the Karanovo settlement in the 1930s when a tell - a settlement mound - was excavated at Karanovo. The hilltop settlement is constituted of 18 buildings, which housed some 100 inhabitants. The site was inhabited more or less continuously from the early 7th to the early 2nd millennia BC.
The Karanovo culture served as the foundation of the East Balkan cultural sequence. The layers at Karanovo are employed as a chronological system for Balkans prehistory. This culture had seven major phases: Karanovo I and II, which existed parallel to Starčevo; Karanovo III (Veselinovo); Karanovo IV; Karanovo V (Marica); Karanovo VI (Gumelniţa); and, Karanovo VII, which emerged during the Early Bronze Age. The Karanovo I is considered a continuation of Near Eastern settlement type. Karanovo VI appeared to have collapsed around 4000 BC without any signs of conquest or resettlement.

Characteristics 

Some of the main characteristics of the Karanovo culture are the white-painted pottery and dark-painted vessels obtained from the tell. These artifacts were particularly associated with the first and second phases. There is also the case of The Gumelnita Lovers, a terracotta statuette crafted from 5000-4750 BCE. This artifact, which was excavated at the Gumelnita Tell in southern Romania, is associated with the culture's notion of fertility. There is also the Karanovo macroblade technology, which featured semi-steep and steep retouching as well as the use of yellow flint with white spots. This particular technology, which is also known as "Karanovo blade", emerged during the culture's early Neolithic phase. Scholars note its interesting length and width: 100 mm long and between 15 mm and 23 mm wide.

Karanovo II is distinguished from its predecessor due to its influence on the Thracian culture, or the assimilation of its elements into those inherited from Karanovo I. The basic characteristics of this phase continued until Karanovo III and were particularly pronounced in its coarsely made ware, such as pitchers, shallow dishes, and cylindrical vases (e.g. Kügel).

The burial practices of Karanovo I and II were similar to the practices of other eastern Balkan cultures, such as the Kremikovci, Dudesti, and Ovcarovo cultures.

Gallery

See also
 Old Europe
 Durankulak
 Solnitsata
 Tell Yunatsite
 List of ancient cities in Thrace and Dacia
 Perperikon
 Seuthopolis

Literature
Stefan Hiller, Vassil Nikolov (eds.), Karanovo III. Beiträge zum Neolithikum in Südosteuropa Österreichisch-Bulgarische Ausgrabungen und Forschungen in Karanovo, Band III, Vienna (2000), .

References

External links

Bulgaria Travel
World Museum

Stone Age Europe
Archaeology of Bulgaria
6th millennium BC
Archaeological cultures in Romania